Sherman John Howard (November 28, 1924 – December 5, 2019) was a professional American football player.  He played professionally as a halfback for four seasons in the National Football League (NFL) with the New York Yanks and Cleveland Browns. At the time of his death, Howard was considered to be both the oldest living African American NFL player  and the oldest living Cleveland Brown. Prior to his NFL career, Howard served in the U.S. Army during World War II. After his NFL career Howard was both a high school coach and teacher. Howard resided in a suburb of Chicago. He died in December 2019 at the age of 95.

References

External links
 

1924 births
2019 deaths
American football halfbacks
Cleveland Browns players
Iowa Hawkeyes football players
Nevada Wolf Pack football players
New York Yanks players
Players of American football from Chicago
Players of American football from New Orleans
Military personnel from Louisiana
African-American players of American football
20th-century African-American sportspeople
21st-century African-American people